Katharina Petra Wolpe (9 September 1931 – 9 February 2013) was an Austrian born British pianist. Her repertoire included Austrian and German composers but in particular Schumann, Brahms, Arnold Schoenberg and her own father.

Life 

Wolpe was born in Grinzing within Vienna in 1931. Her parents were both Jews. They had married in 1927 but by the time Katherina was born they were living separately. Her father Stefan Wolpe was a composer, and her mother Ola (née Okuniewska) was a painter born in Czechoslovakia.

In 1938 she and her mother were trapped in Vienna but they managed to leave and then they walked to Serbia. Her father was long gone having left for Israel when Katherina was young. Her mother left her in Switzerland while she went to England to become an art teacher to make a living. Katherina found herself a de facto orphan in Berne during the war. By the time she arrived in London she was sixteen and a skilled pianist. She gave her first concert soon after her arrival.

Her repertoire included Austrian and German composers like Haydn, Mozart, Schoenberg and Beethoven but in particular Schumann and Brahms. In 1951 her father wrote "Form for Piano" which he dedicated to his daughter.

In 1991 she spent many hours recording all the music composed by Arnold Schoenberg. In 1997 she recorded an her performance of works by her father including "Piece of Embittered Music" from his Zemach Suite (1939), "Studies, Part 1" (1944–51) and "Form for Piano". It was called "Thinking Twice" after a series of lectures her had given.

Her mother taught but she was a lifelong artist. She was religious and modest and she never exhibited her work. The work was linked to music and the house she and her mother shared would be visited by composers. There she would teach pianists and her mother taught painters.

Wolpe died in Hampstead in 2013.

References 

Women classical pianists
1931 births
2013 deaths
Jewish emigrants from Austria to the United Kingdom after the Anschluss
Austrian pianists